Bathinda Cantt station is a small railway station in Bathinda, Punjab, serving Bathinda city. Its code is BTIC. It has 2 platforms, which are not well sheltered, and lacks water and sanitation facilities.

Major trains 
 Kalka–Barmer Express
 Barmer–Haridwar Link Express
 Kalka–Barmer Chandigarh Express
 Kalka–Shri Ganganagar Express
 Dhuri–Bhatinda Passenger
 Bhatinda–Ambala Passenger
 Ambala Cantt–Shri Ganganagar Passenger

References

External links
 

Railway stations in Bathinda district
Ambala railway division
Transport in Bathinda